was a Japanese samurai of the late Edo period, who served the Matsudaira clan of Aizu. He was a karō in the Aizu domain's administration. Kayano served in a senior military role during the Boshin War, he was later imprisoned by the Meiji government and made to commit suicide in Tokyo.

References
http://www.geocities.co.jp/SilkRoad-Lake/6618/honmon2/91.html
Tsunabuchi Kenjō (1984). Matsudaira Katamori no subete.

1830 births
1869 deaths
People from Aizu
Karō
Samurai
Seppuku from Meiji period to present
People of the Boshin War
Aizu-Matsudaira retainers
Suicides by sharp instrument in Japan
1860s suicides